The first USS Craven (Torpedo Boat Destroyer No. 10/TB-10), was launched 25 September 1899 by Bath Iron Works, Bath, Maine; sponsored by Miss A. Craven, granddaughter of Commander Craven; and commissioned 9 June 1900.

Sailing from Portsmouth Navy Yard 19 June 1900, Craven reported to the Naval Torpedo Station at Newport 21 June and served there until 2 December when she returned to Portsmouth. She was placed out of commission there 5 December 1900.

Recommissioned 24 October 1902, Craven served at the Torpedo Station at Newport until 12 December 1903 when she sailed to New York Navy Yard. She was placed out of commission again 22 December 1903. Except for service with the Torpedo Station in 1906 and 1907, she remained out of commission until 14 December 1907 when she was assigned to the Reserve Torpedo Flotilla at Norfolk Navy Yard. In 1908 she was transferred to Charleston, South Carolina, where she was decommissioned 14 November 1913 and used as a target.

References 

Additional technical data from

External links

 

Torpedo boats of the United States Navy
Ships built in Bath, Maine
1899 ships
Ships sunk as targets
Shipwrecks
Maritime incidents in 1913